Umberto Brizzi (10 January 1908 – 28 August 1991) was an Italian weightlifter. In the 1936 Summer Olympics, he finished ninth in the featherweight class.

References

External links
 

1908 births
1991 deaths
Italian male weightlifters
Olympic weightlifters of Italy
Weightlifters at the 1936 Summer Olympics
20th-century Italian people